Protocooperation is where two species interact with each other beneficially; they have no need to interact with each other - they interact purely for the gain that they receive from doing this. It is not at all necessary for protocooperation to occur; growth and survival is possible in the absence of the interaction. The interaction that occurs can be between different kingdoms.

The term, initially used for intraspecific interactions, was popularized by Eugene Odum (1953), although other authors prefer to use the terms "cooperation" or "mutualism".

Mutualism

Protocooperation is a form of mutualism, but the cooperating species do not depend on each other for survival. An example of protocooperation happens between soil bacteria or fungi, and the plants that occur growing in the soil. None of the species rely on the relationship for survival, but all of the fungi, bacteria and higher plants take part in shaping soil composition and fertility. Soil bacteria and fungi interrelate with each other, forming nutrients essential to the plants survival. The plants obtain nutrients from root nodules and decomposing organic substance. Plants benefit by getting essential mineral nutrients and carbon dioxide. The plants do not need these mineral nutrients but do help the plant grow even further.

Examples

Ants and aphids

A further example of protocooperation is the connection between ants and aphids. The ant searches for food on trees and shrubs that are hosts to honeydew-secreting species such as aphids, mealybugs, and some scales. The ant gathers the sugary substance and takes it to its nest as food for its offspring. It has been known for the ant to stimulate the aphid to secrete honeydew straight into its mouth. Some ant species even look after the honeydew producers from natural predators. In areas where the ant inhabits the same ecosystem as the aphid, the plants they inhabit normally suffer from a higher presence of aphids which is detrimental to the plant but not to the two species protocooperating.

Flowers and insects
The flowers of plants that are pollinated by insects and birds benefit from protocooperation. The plants, particularly those with large bright colourful flowers bearing nectar glands, experience cross pollination because of the insects activities. This is beneficial to the insect that has got the food supply of pollen and nectar required for its survival.

Birds
Protocooperation can occur in birds. The Egyptian plover removes insect pests from the backs of buffalo, antelope, giraffes, and rhinos. The cattle egret in America as well does the same task of removing the unwanted insects and parasites.

Fish
Certain fish perform the task of cleaning other fish, by removing ectoparasites, cleaning wounded flesh, and getting rid of dead flesh. Even predatory fish rely on cleansing symbionts, and adopt a placid state while they are cleansed. The fish that do the cleansing are often concentrated around specific sites where the other fish come to be cleansed. These are known as cleansing stations.

Bacteria 
Prominently exhibited between Lactobacillus delbrueckii ssp Bulgaricus and Streptococcus thermophillus, the two symbiotic starter bacteria commonly used in yoghurt starter culture. The acid lowers the pH of the milk to an optimal level for L. bulgaricus. L. bulgaricus produces peptides, free amino acids, and putrescine through proteolysis, which stimulate the growth of S. thermophilus.

See also
 Symbiosis

References

Ecology